Joseph Edward Kenny (1845 – 9 April 1900) was an Irish physician, Coroner of the City of Dublin, nationalist politician and Member of Parliament (MP).  In the House of Commons of the United Kingdom of Great Britain and Ireland, he was an Irish Parliamentary Party MP for South Cork from 1885 to 1892, and then a Parnellite MP for Dublin College Green from 1892 until his resignation in 1896.  

Son of J. Kenny, manager of a lead mine at Palmerstown, Co. Dublin, he was educated at the Catholic University of Ireland in Dublin and at the University of Edinburgh, where he obtained his doctorate in medicine (M.D.) in 1870.  After returning to Dublin, he became a medical officer to the North Dublin Union and in this role treated smallpox victims in the "sheds" at Glasnevin in the north Dublin epidemic of 1872. He caught the disease himself in spite of having been vaccinated.

An active Irish Nationalist, in 1881 he was arrested under the Coercion Act and confined in Kilmainham Jail. Here his status as a qualified physician was of considerable value to his fellow Nationalist prisoners, including Charles Stewart Parnell, because he was able to insist that the prison authorities provide proper medical care. As a result of this prison term he was dismissed from his post as a medical officer to the North Dublin Union by Chief Secretary W. E. Forster. The Prime Minister Gladstone ordered his reinstatement to this post after his case was raised by Irish members in the House of Commons. Kenny was one of the Treasurers of the Land League and later of the Irish National League. He later became physician to the Catholic national seminary at Maynooth.

At the 1885 general election, Kenny won South Cork by a huge majority over the Irish Conservative Party candidate. He was then returned unopposed in 1886. When the Irish Party split over Parnell's leadership in 1890, Kenny supported Parnell. As a result of the hostility of the Catholic Church to Parnell, Kenny was dismissed from his position as Medical Officer at Maynooth College on 23 October 1891, on straightforwardly political grounds. He was one of only nine Parnellites elected to Parliament in 1892, although he easily won Dublin College Green, securing just over 50 per cent of the vote in a three-cornered fight, and defeating the sitting anti-Parnellite T. D. Sullivan. He was then returned unopposed for the same seat in 1895. In July 1891  he was elected as Coroner for the City of Dublin (prior to the Local Government (Ireland) Act 1898, coroners in Ireland were elected).  Kenny resigned his parliamentary seat in 1896 on the ground that he could no longer attend the House of Commons regularly.

He died in office as Coroner at the relatively young age of about 55, of blood poisoning after a tooth extraction.

Footnotes

Selected writings
 Report of the Medical Commission of the Mansion House Committee, by George Sigerson and Joseph E. Kenny, Dublin, Mansion House, 1880

Sources
 Freeman's Journal, 10 April 1900
 Margaret Leamy, Parnell’s Faithful Few, New York, Macmillan, 1936
 F. S. L. Lyons, Charles Stewart Parnell, London, Collins, 1977, pp. 183–6
 The Times (London), 1 December 1885, 5 July 1892, 31 March 1896
 Brian M. Walker (ed.), Parliamentary Election Results in Ireland, 1801-1922, Dublin, Royal Irish Academy, 1978
 Who Was Who, 1897-1916

References

External links

1845 births
1900 deaths
Irish Parliamentary Party MPs
Parnellite MPs
UK MPs 1885–1886
UK MPs 1886–1892
UK MPs 1892–1895
UK MPs 1895–1900
Members of the Parliament of the United Kingdom for County Cork constituencies (1801–1922)
Members of the Parliament of the United Kingdom for County Dublin constituencies (1801–1922)